The 2012–13 Football League Two was Wycombe Wanderers' 125th season in existence and their nineteenth season in the Football League. This page shows the statistics of the club's players in the season, and also lists all matches that the club played during the season.

Wycombe Wanderers ended the season strongly and finished in 15th place in League Two, after a poor start to the campaign.

The end of the season also saw the retirement of Gareth Ainsworth (Wycombe's player-manager). Ainsworth's career had spanned 18 years and saw him play for 10 different clubs. He made his final appearance in Wycombe's 1–1 draw with Port Vale on 27 April 2013.

League Two

League table

Match results

Legend

Friendlies

Football League Two

FA Cup

League Cup

Football League Trophy

Squad statistics

Appearances and goals

|-
|colspan="14"|Players left the club before the end of the season:

|}

Top scorers

*Beavon left the club before the end of the season

Disciplinary record

Transfers

See also
 2012–13 in English football
 2012–13 Football League Two
 Wycombe Wanderers F.C.
 Gary Waddock
 Gareth Ainsworth

References

External links
 Wycombe Wanderers official website

Wycombe Wanderers F.C. seasons
Wycombe Wanderers